Tit Galop Pour Mamou (English: either Canter to Mamou or Giddy-Yap to Mamou) is a Cajun folk song with words and music by Dewey Balfa.  The tune behind Joe South's "Games People Play" resembles the tune of "Tit Galop Pour Mamou" to some extent.
 
A recording of the song by Mamou Master was used on the soundtrack of the 1991 film Scorchers. The song was also recorded as the title cut of a 1992 album by Steve Riley and the Mamou Playboys.

The album was first released 1965 and is considered Volume 1.  Volume 2 was released in 1974 however, in 1994, both were re-released as a double album set.

Content
The song's narrator tells of a trip to the Louisiana town of Mamou, where he sells his mule and wagon for 15 cents to buy candies for children and sugar and coffee for older people.

References

1965 songs
Cajun folk songs